Madame Bovary is a 2000 British drama directed by Tim Fywell and based on the 1857 novel of the same name by French author Gustave Flaubert. It was broadcast in two parts on 6 and 13 February in the U.S.A on WGBH-TV and on 10 and 11 April in the United Kingdom on BBC Two.

Cast 
Frances O'Connor as Emma Bovary
Hugh Bonneville as Charles Bovary
Eileen Atkins as Marie Louise
Hugh Dancy as Leon Dupuis

Reception
The drama was nominated for British Academy Television Awards for best costume design and for best make-up and hair design. Frances O'Connor was nominated for a Golden Globe Award for Best Actress – Miniseries or Television Film.

References

External links

2000 British television series debuts
2000 British television series endings
2000s British drama television series
2000s British television miniseries
Adultery in television
Films about infidelity
Films based on Madame Bovary
BBC television dramas
Television shows based on French novels
Television shows set in Hertfordshire
Television shows set in France
English-language television shows